Leslie William Brotherston  is a British set and costume designer. He trained at the Central School of Art and Design, graduating in theatre design in 1984. He was a production designer of Letter to Brezhnev in the same year. He has worked in dance, theatre, opera, musicals and film, and has collaborated with Matthew Bourne. He won the Olivier Award for Cinderella and the Tony Award for Swan Lake.

National Life Stories conducted an oral history interview (C1173/10) with Lez Brotherston in 2006 for its An Oral History of Theatre Design collection held by the British Library.

Brotherston was appointed Officer of the Order of the British Empire (OBE) in the 2022 New Year Honours for services to dance and theatre.

References

External links

British scenic designers
Living people
Alumni of the Central School of Art and Design
Year of birth missing (living people)
Place of birth missing (living people)
Tony Award winners
Officers of the Order of the British Empire